HubPages is an American online publishing platform developed by Paul Edmondson and was launched in 2006. Hubpages acquired its main competitor, Squidoo, in 2014. In 2018 Seattle-based content company "TheMaven, Inc." acquired Hubpages. Hubpages was a startup that struggled for over 12 years until its acquisition by Maven. The company is headquartered in San Francisco.

History 
The site launched on August 5, 2006, funded by a US$2 million investment from Hummer Winblad. The three founders, Paul Edmonson, Paul Deeds, and Jay Reitz, are former employees of Microsoft and were part of the startup MongoMusic.

It raised $8 million between 2007–2008 and has not been able to raise any since and struggled for the next ten years.

In 2011, traffic to revenue-sharing sites, including HubPages, was slashed following changes to Google's algorithm ("Panda").  Over the ensuing years, HubPages made strenuous efforts to recover from the setback, while most of its competitors gave up and closed their doors.  In 2014 HubPages acquired its largest competitor, Squidoo, in a friendly takeover.

In 2016, HubPages announced it was moving from a single-site to a multi-site structure with the introduction of separate "vertical sites".  Each site contains articles covering a group of broadly related subjects.

In 2018, it was acquired by Maven which gave investors a mild payout.

User information and features

Users 
Hubpages does not publish official user stats on its website. According to Business Wire, the platform had about 35 million monthly visitors in January 2018. In March 2018 Business Wire released another report according to which, the platform had about 43 million monthly visitors.

Memberships 
Hubpages unlike its competitor Medium is not a subscription-based platform and users can become a member free of cost.

Partner Program
Members post informational articles and earn a share of the income from those articles through the HubPages Earnings Program.  At one time, having an AdSense account was a prerequisite for being a member but no longer.

See also
 Squidoo

References

External links 
 Official site

Online mass media companies of the United States
Knowledge markets
Internet properties established in 2006